The John Bennett House was built in 1839 with an addition built in 1854, was built as part of a real estate development near the Third County Courthouse in Historic Richmondtown, Staten Island, New York. This Greek Revival style residence was home to shipping merchant John Bennett and his family from c.1848-1917. The building later served as a restaurant. A seasonal cafe and restaurant is located in the cellar bakery and is accessible from Richmond Road.

See also 
 List of New York City Designated Landmarks in Staten Island
 National Register of Historic Places listings in Richmond County, New York

References 
Neighborhood Preservation Center, New York, NY - official website

Houses completed in 1839
Historic Richmond Town
Houses in Staten Island
New York City Designated Landmarks in Staten Island